The Nykis is a river of  Kėdainiai district municipality, Kaunas County, central Lithuania. It is a right tributary of the Liaudė. It originates in Balsiai forest and goes to the east, meeting the Liaudė in Paberžė village.

There are 3 ponds on the Nykis. The river passes Vikaičiai, Margininkai, Graužiai, Miegėnai, Paberžė villages.

References
 LIETUVOS RESPUBLIKOS UPIŲ IR TVENKINIŲ KLASIFIKATORIUS (Republic of Lithuania- River and Pond Classifications).  Ministry of Environment (Lithuania). Accessed 2011-11-17.

Rivers of Lithuania
Kėdainiai District Municipality